Kevin H. Knuth is an associate professor of physics at the University at Albany (SUNY). Knuth conducts research in information physics, foundations of quantum mechanics, and Bayesian analysis with applications towards various problems in physics.  He also conducts research into UFOs.

Education 
Knuth received a Bachelor of Science in physics and mathematics from the University of Wisconsin–Oshkosh in 1988, a Master of Science in physics from Montana State University in 1990, and a PhD in physics (with a minor in mathematics) from the University of Minnesota (1995).

Academic career 
After receiving his doctorate, Knuth taught in the Department of Speech and Hearing Sciences of the Graduate Center, CUNY, the Departments of Otolaryngology and Neuroscience of the Albert Einstein College of Medicine, and the Department of Physiology and Biophysics of the Cornell University Medical Center from 1997 to 2000. He also worked as a researcher at the Nathan Kline Institute for Psychiatric Research from 1999 to 2001 and at NASA's Ames Research Center from 2001 to 2005. He became an assistant professor of physics at the University at Albany in 2005 and was promoted to associate professor in 2009.

He has been editor-in-chief of the MDPI journal Entropy since 2012.

UAP research 
Knuth has been quoted in the media on the topic of Unidentified Aerial Phenomena (UAP). He serves as vice president of UAPx, a nonprofit organization that aims to conduct field research about UAP, and is a research affiliate of The Galileo Project for the systematic scientific search for evidence of extraterrestrial technological artifacts at Harvard University.

References

External links 
 
  Knuth Information Physics Lab
 UAPx Nonprofit UAP research organization

University at Albany, SUNY faculty
Quantum physicists
Theoretical physicists
American astrophysicists
Year of birth missing (living people)
Living people
Ufologists